Arbelodes deprinsi is a moth in the family Cossidae. It is found in South Africa, where it has been recorded from the forest-grassland mosaic of the Dragon Peaks Mountain Resort.

The length of the forewings is about 15 mm. The forewings are deep olive-buff with pale olive-grey patches along the termen. The hindwings are glossy, deep olive-buff.

Etymology
The species is named in honour of Willy De Prins.

References

Natural History Museum Lepidoptera generic names catalog

Endemic moths of South Africa
Moths described in 2010
Metarbelinae